|}

The Centenary Novices' Handicap Chase, known for sponsorship purposes as the Paddy's Reward Club Novices' Handicap Chase, is a Listed National Hunt steeplechase in Great Britain which is open to horses aged five years or older. It is run at Sandown Park over a distance of about 2 miles and 4 furlongs (2 miles 4 furlongs and 10 yards, or 4,033 metres), and during its running there are sixteen fences to be jumped. It was a handicap race for novice chasers with a handicap rating between 0 and 145, and it takes place each year in March.

The event was originally run at Cheltenham Racecourse and was established when a fourth day was added to the Cheltenham Festival in 2005. The winning ride by Mattie Batchelor in the inaugural edition subsequently won the Lester Award for Jump Ride of the Year. The race was sponsored by Jewson from 2005 to 2010 and run as the Jewson Novices' Handicap Chase on the third day of the Festival. Jewson transferred their sponsorship to a new race at the 2011 Festival, the Jewson Novices' Chase, which remained on the third day while the Novices' Handicap Chase was moved to become the final race on the opening day of the Festival. The race title commemorated the centenary of the Cheltenham Festival in 2011. In 2012 the race was sponsored by Pulteney Land Investments and from 2013 to 2014 by Rewards4Racing. In 2015 it was sponsored by Chaps Restaurants Barbados and from 2016 to 2019 the race was sponsored by Close Brothers Group. The race's sponsors in 2020 were Northern Trust and since 2021 it has been sponsored by Paddy Power.

The Centenary Novices' Chase was removed from the Festival programme in 2021 to make way for a new steeplechase for mares, the Liberthine Mares' Chase and was transferred to the meeting which takes place at Sandown Park a few days before the Cheltenham Festival. The race held Listed status until 2022 and was re-classified as a Premier Handicap from the 2023 running when Listed status was removed from handicap races.

Records
Leading jockey (2 wins):
 Graham Lee - L'Antartique (2007), Divers (2011)
 Brian Hughes – Ballyalton (2016), Mister Whitaker (2018)
 Brendan Powell jnr - Present View (2014), Killer Kane (2022)

Leading trainer (2 wins):
 Ferdy Murphy - L'Antartique (2007), Divers (2011)

Winners
 Weights given in stones and pounds.

See also
 Horse racing in Great Britain
 List of British National Hunt races

References

 racenewsonline.co.uk – Racenews Archive (February 21, 2008).

 Racing Post:

National Hunt races in Great Britain
Cheltenham Racecourse
National Hunt chases
Recurring sporting events established in 2005
2005 establishments in England
Sandown Park Racecourse